In Aboriginal mythology (specifically: Karadjeri), Ngariman is a quoll-man who killed the Bagadjimbiri, two dingo gods and sons of Dilga, an earth goddess.  In revenge, she drowned Ngariman with her milk by flooding the cavern where he killed her sons.

Sources
 Piddington, Ralph (1932) "Karadjeri Initiation" in Oceana, Volume 3, Issue 1, September 1932, Pages 46-87
 "Bagadjimbiri" A Dictionary of World Mythology: 1St American Ed by Arthur Cotterell. Oxford University Press, 1980. pp. 270-271

See also
Indigenous Australians
Mythology
Kinie Ger

Australian Aboriginal mythology